Adelbert F. "Bert" Waldron III (March 14, 1933 – October 18, 1995) was a United States Army sniper who served during the Vietnam War with the 9th Infantry Division. Until 2011, Waldron held the record for most confirmed kills by any American sniper (109 confirmed kills).

Early life
Adelbert was born 14 March 1933 to Adeline Baxter Waldron and Adelbert F. Waldron, a parking lot operator, detective agency employee, fireman and school bus driver in Syracuse, New York.  He had two sisters.

Career
Prior to his time in the Army, Waldron spent 12 years in the US Navy. As a member of the 9th Infantry Division, he was assigned to PBR boats patrolling the Mekong Delta, at one point making a confirmed kill from a moving boat at 900 yards. He set his record of 109 kills in just 8 months. After leaving Vietnam he was assigned as a marksmanship instructor at Ft. Benning, GA but left the Army in 1970.

Waldron was one of the few two-time recipients of the Distinguished Service Cross, both awarded for separate actions in 1969. In addition to these he was awarded a Silver Star, multiple Bronze Stars, and a Presidential Unit Citation.

Waldron is buried in Riverside National Cemetery in Riverside, California.

See also
 Chris Kyle (United States Navy SEAL) was in 2011 credited with 160 kills.
 Carlos Hathcock (United States Marine Corps) had 93 confirmed kills
 Eric R. England (United States Marine Corps) had 98 kills
 Chuck Mawhinney (United States Marine Corps) had 103 kills.
 Simo Häyhä, the record-holder for any major war with 505 confirmed kills.
 Longest recorded sniper kills
List of snipers

References

Bibliography
 
 
 "Little Known Sniper" (website) accessed 18 August 2010 http://council.smallwarsjournal.com/archive/index.php/t-2178.html

American military snipers
United States Army personnel of the Vietnam War
Recipients of the Distinguished Service Cross (United States)
American Protestants
Recipients of the Silver Star
United States Army soldiers
Burials at Riverside National Cemetery
1933 births
1995 deaths